Tettoedischiidae is an extinct family of Orthoptera. There are at least two genera and two described species in Tettoedischiidae.

Genera
These two genera belong to the family Tettoedischiidae:
 † Macroedischia Sharov, 1968
 † Tettoedischia Sharov, 1968

References

Orthoptera
Prehistoric insect families